is a railway station on the Osaka Metro in Shikitsu-higashi Sanchome, Naniwa-ku, Osaka, Japan.

Lines

 (Station Number: M21)
(Station Number: Y16)

While Midōsuji and Yotsubashi lines are connected at several stations, Daikokuchō is the only such station where passengers can transfer the trains from one line to the other on the same platform in case of trains of same direction (cross-platform interchange).

Layout
This station has two island platforms on the second basement, serving four tracks.

External links

References

Railway stations in Osaka Prefecture
Railway stations in Japan opened in 1938
Osaka Metro stations